The goldspotted eel (Myrichthys ocellatus), also known as the goldspotted snake eel or the dark-spotted snake eel, is an eel in the family Ophichthidae (worm/snake eels). It was described by Charles Alexandre Lesueur in 1825, originally under the genus Muraenophis. It is a marine, tropical eel which is known from the western and eastern Atlantic Ocean, including Bermuda, southern Florida, USA; the Bahamas, Santa Catarina, and Brazil.

The Goldspotted eel is a commercial aquarium fish. As is common with eels, it forages for food mostly during the night; its diet consists of crabs, stomatopods, and echinoderms.

References

External links
 

goldspotted eel
Fish of the Caribbean
Fish of the Dominican Republic
Fish of the Western Atlantic
goldspotted eel